Owner of a Lonely Heart may refer to:
"Owner of a Lonely Heart", a 1983 song by Yes
"Owner of a Lonely Heart" (Grey's Anatomy)
"Owner of a Lonely Heart" (D:TNG episode)
"Co-Owner of a Lonely Heart", an episode of Class